Friedrich Casimir may refer to:

 Friedrich Casimir, Count of Hanau-Lichtenberg (1623–1685)
 Frederick Casimir Kettler (1650–1698), 1698), Duke of Courland and Semigallia